Inestroza is a surname. Notable people with the surname include:

Francisco Inestroza, Honduran politician and President of Honduras
Renan Inestroza (born 1965), Honduran politician

See also
Inostroza